Grosmont (archaically spelt Growmond) is a village and civil parish situated in Eskdale in the North York Moors National Park, within the boundaries of the Scarborough district of the county of North Yorkshire, England.

Grosmont Priory was established in the 12th century and closed during the dissolution of the monasteries in the 16th century. The village was established in the 1830s when the Whitby to Pickering Railway was built, and grew as a result of industrial iron ore extraction, and in the 1860s the development of an ironworks led to further growth. Up to at least the 1850s the village was known as Tunnel.

History
The River Esk at Grosmont, west of the priory was the crossing place of the ancient structure known as Wade's Causeway.

A priory was established in the early 13th century, but no major settlements existed until the industrial revolution (1830s) when the arrival of railways and demand for iron led to the creation of a new village "Tunnel" later named Grosmont, and to the establishment of an iron works.

Grosmont Priory
Grosmont Priory was a Grandmontine religious house, one of three in England.

A fire destroyed most of the priory in 1360. In 1394 the Abbot of Grandimont gained permission to sell the priory, which was acquired by John Hewitt. The priory continued until the dissolution of the monasteries in the 1530s. At the time of dissolution the priory had four priors; a net income of £12 2s 8d per year; its buildings included a church with a bell tower, chapter house, kitchen and lodgings. The priory was located on the banks of the Esk.

Tunnel, or Grosmont village

A canal was surveyed in 1793 from Ruswarp near Whitby passing through Grosmont, Beck Hole and Newton Dale to Pickering, but was not pursued. A railway connection from Whitby was considered in the 1820s, with lines either to Pickering or Stockton via the Esk valley; surveying began in the 1830s, followed by formation of a company to raise capital for a line to Pickering; an act of parliament for Whitby and Pickering Railway was obtained in 1833. In May 1835 a daily service began on the partially completed line between Whitby and the Tunnel Inn in Grosmont. The railway company constructed the village inn and post office (1835/6).

The opening of the railway in 1836 brought industrial development: four lime kilns were constructed by the Whitby and Grosmont Lime Company, supplied with stone from Pickering; and the Whitby Stone company exported ironstone mined in the Grosmont area and building stone. The first recipient of ore from Grosmont was the Birtley Iron Company in 1836.

Growth of Grosmont around the railway, river bridge and the 'Tunnel Inn' was observed by Henry Belcher in 1836:

The village was known as "Tunnel" early in its history.

In 1839 a second iron mine was begun by Mr Berwick on behalf of the landowner, Mrs Clark. Competition from Scottish black band ironstone resulted in a loss of trade for the mines in 1842/3. An increase in demand for ore in the mid-1840s led to the Grosmont mines becoming active again. A contract from Bolckow and Vaughan for 36,000 tons over three years was made in 1846. The area became an important supplier of iron stone; supplying one third of the ironworks in northern eastern England by 1848. Discovery of large deposits of ore in north Cleveland in 1850 closer to the consumers reduced demand for ore from south Cleveland.

Henry Belcher raised funds to construct St Matthew's Church which was established in 1842 at a cost of £1,260. The York and North Midland Railway acquired the line in the 1840s and made improvements; at Grosmont a stone bridge, a new tunnel and a railway station were constructed. By 1859 Grosmont had developed into a small town, with a Literary Institute and a National School.

By 1861 three ironstone mines, Whitby Stone Co, Birtley Iron Co, and Mrs Clarks' mine, were extracting 30,000, 10,000 and 30,000 tons of ore respectively per annum. In 1862 Charles and Thomas Bagnall started an ironworks, 'Grosmont Works' and two blast furnaces were built by 1863. Furnace gas was extracted by a refractory lined iron tube built into the top ('throat') of the furnace – the gas was used to heat boilers, and hot blast stoves. The site was connected to the railway by a siding. The Bagnalls acquired the land containing the Whitby Stone Company's mines to secure its supply of ore, and built back to back cottages for their workers in the village. Mrs Clark's mines were acquired in 1864.

In 1865 a railway connection at Grosmont westwards to Castleton was opened, completing a connection from Whitby to the north-east ports.

Grosmont ironworks

The ironworks employed about 500 people and produced about 40,000 tons of iron at its peak between 1865 and 1875. A brickworks was established in 1870, east of the railway line and ironworks, and north of the village. The village population reached a peak of 1600 in 1880; a village cooperative society and Methodist church were founded in 1867, a Working Men's Institute was established in 1871, the church of St Matthew was rebuilt and enlarged in the decade after 1875.

A third blast furnace was constructed and began production in 1876. Several negative factors affected the works after the mid-1870s: a drop in iron prices of 75% in the late 1870s; difficulty in obtaining coal during a strike in the Durham Coalfield around 1879, and industrial problems at the works in 1880. The works closed in 1891, and were offered for sale and the buildings demolished in the early 1890s. As a result of its closure, the village population dropped to 872 by 1901. The works produced an estimated one million tons of slag. After closure the slag heaps were reprocessed to make road stone, and slag wool; reprocessing continued until at least the early 1930s. The brickworks expanded during the first decades of the 20th century: its  chimney was built in 1902; and a Hoffmann kiln was constructed in 1923; the brickworks operated until 1957.

Excluding the building of Ings Terrace in the post second world war period, there has been no urban expansion of the village since the 19th century. In 1963 the railway line to Pickering closed but was reopened by volunteers as the North Yorkshire Moors Railway in 1973.

Geography

The parish of Grosmont is located in the valley of the River Esk, near its confluence with the Murk Esk. Excluding farms, the village is the only habitation in the parish. According to the 2011 UK census, the parish had a population of 318, a reduction on the 2001 UK census figure of 335.
Several of the road access routes have steep gradients. The village is on National Rail's Esk Valley Line served by Grosmont railway station, which is also used by the North Yorkshire Moors Railway (NYMR), forming the northern terminus of its heritage railway to Pickering.

Landmarks
Grosmont is home to the NYMR's engine shed. A number of structures in and near the village are listed, including: the three-arch sandstone road bridge over the Esk, dating from around 1700; the early 19th-century 'Eskdale Villa' on the eastern outskirts of the village; and in the village the 19th-century 'Rose Cottage'.

Several railway-related buildings and structures are listed, including the 'Station Tavern' public house and outbuildings (originally "The Tunnel Inn"); the Post Office; and the former horse tramway tunnel, now a pedestrian route; all built for the Whitby and Pickering Railway in the 1830s. Also listed are the Murk Esk railway bridge (1845); 1845 railway tunnel, and the G.T. Andrews-designed Grosmont Railway station (1846), all built for the York and North Midland Railway.

Sport 
Grosmont Cricket Club has a history of activity dating back to 1918 and the club's ground is based on Front Street, Grosmont. The club have two senior teams: a Saturday 1st XI that compete in the Scarborough Beckett Cricket League and a Midweek Senior XI in the Esk Valley Evening League.

Notable people
Actor Ian Carmichael lived in the village for many years with his wife, novelist Kate Fenton.

Notes

References

Sources

, Plates 62-66

Locations

External links

Villages in North Yorkshire
Civil parishes in North Yorkshire
Ironstone Mines in North Yorkshire